Allium ovalifolium is a Chinese species of onion widely cultivated as an ornamental in other regions. It grows at elevations of 1500–4000 m. The Tibetan people of Shangri-La and nearby areas eat its scapes.

Allium ovalifolium produces narrow cylindrical bulbs. Scapes are up to 60 cm tall, round in cross-section. Leaves are flat, lanceolate to ovate, up to 15 cm long by 7 cm wide. Umbel is spherical, densely crowded with many white or pale red flowers.

Varieties
 Allium ovalifolium var. cordifolium (J.M.Xu) J.M.Xu - Sichuan
 Allium ovalifolium var. leuconeurum J.M.Xu - Sichuan
 Allium ovalifolium var. ovalifolium - Gansu, Guizhou, Hubei, Qinghai, Shaanxi, Sichuan, Yunnan

References

ovalifolium
Onions
Flora of China
Plants described in 1924